The 28th Rifle Corps was a corps of the Soviet Red Army. It was part of the 4th Army. It took part in the Great Patriotic War.

Battle

Organization 
 6th Rifle Division
 42nd Rifle Division

Commanders 
 general-major Vasily Popov

Rifle corps of the Soviet Union